Hawsh al-Dawahira (also spelled Hosh Eldawahreh) is a Syrian village located in Douma District. Hawsh al-Dawahira had a population of 3,415 in the 2004 census.

References

Populated places in Douma District